Freeman Township is a township in Freeborn County, Minnesota, United States. The population was 528 at the 2000 census.

History
Freeman Township was organized in 1861, and named for John Freeman, an early settler.

Geography

Goose Creek flows through the township.

Transportation

Interstate 35 passes through the center of the township, leading north to Albert Lea and south to Iowa. County Road 13 exit provides access to the northern part of the township. County Road 5 exit provides access to the center part of the township. U.S. Highway 69 passes through the northwest corner of the township near Twin Lakes. U.S. Highway 65 passes through the northeast corner of the township near Glenville.

Demographics
As of the census of 2000, there were 528 people, 204 households, and 162 families residing in the township. The population density was 14.7 people per square mile (5.7/km2). There were 212 housing units at an average density of 5.9/sq mi (2.3/km2). The racial makeup of the township was 99.43% White, 0.19% African American and 0.38% Asian. Hispanic or Latino of any race were 1.33% of the population.

There were 204 households, out of which 31.9% had children under the age of 18 living with them, 70.1% were married couples living together, 4.9% had a female householder with no husband present, and 20.1% were non-families. 16.2% of all households were made up of individuals, and 4.9% had someone living alone who was 65 years of age or older. The average household size was 2.59 and the average family size was 2.90.

In the township the population was spread out, with 23.3% under the age of 18, 5.3% from 18 to 24, 29.0% from 25 to 44, 23.3% from 45 to 64, and 19.1% who were 65 years of age or older. The median age was 41 years. For every 100 females, there were 116.4 males.  For every 100 females age 18 and over, there were 120.1 males.

The median income for a household in the township was $42,292, and the median income for a family was $44,531. Males had a median income of $31,625 versus $22,500 for females. The per capita income for the township was $16,813. About 5.2% of families and 8.9% of the population were below the poverty line, including 9.9% of those under age 18 and 14.5% of those age 65 or over.

References

Townships in Freeborn County, Minnesota
Townships in Minnesota
1861 establishments in Minnesota